Stéphane Lesceux (16 April 1907 – 24 March 1979) was a French sports shooter. He competed in the 300 m rifle event at the 1948 Summer Olympics.

References

External links
 

1907 births
1979 deaths
French male sport shooters
Olympic shooters of France
Shooters at the 1948 Summer Olympics